Paul "Wiggy" Wade-Williams is a game designer who has worked primarily on role-playing games.

Career
Paul Wade-Williams was the Creative Director of Pinnacle Entertainment Group. Wade-Williams created the science-fiction horror setting of Necropolis (2006) and the pulp science-fiction setting Slipstream (2008), which were Pinnacle's final two original settings for Savage Worlds for several years. Wade Williams founded Triple Ace Games in 2008 with Robin Eliott to publish supplements for Savage Worlds. At Triple Ace, Wade-Williams has been creating and expanding settings for Savage Worlds and getting broader distribution thanks to a partnership with Cubicle 7 Entertainment.

References

External links
 

Living people
Role-playing game designers
Year of birth missing (living people)